"Guy Snyder" was also the name of the son of Harry and Esther Snyder 
Guy Eugene Snyder Jr. (born May 3, 1951, in Columbus, Ohio) is an American science fiction writer.

In 1974, he was a finalist for the second ever John W. Campbell Award for Best New Writer, for his 1973 novel Testament XXI.

References

External links

1951 births
Wayne State University alumni
American science fiction writers
Living people
Writers from Columbus, Ohio